Westhaven, California may refer to:
 Westhaven, Fresno County, California
 Westhaven, Humboldt County, California
 Westhaven-Moonstone, California